Alberto Díaz Trujillo (born 7 November 1975) is a Mexican politician and lawyer affiliated with the PAN. He currently serves as Deputy of the LXII Legislature of the Mexican Congress representing the State of Mexico.

References

1975 births
Living people
Politicians from the State of Mexico
21st-century Mexican lawyers
Members of the Chamber of Deputies (Mexico)
National Action Party (Mexico) politicians
21st-century Mexican politicians
Deputies of the LXII Legislature of Mexico